Fonseca is the name of two brands of premium cigar, one produced on the island of Cuba for Habanos SA, the Cuban state-owned tobacco company, and the other produced in Nicaragua by Don Pepin Garcia's My Father Cigar brand.

History
Don Francisco E. Fonseca was born in Manzanillo, Cuba, in 1868 (or possibly 1869 or 1870; the documents differ) and established a factory and his own cigar brand in Havana in 1892. He registered the brand bearing his name in 1907. Fonseca and his wife Teresa Boetticher de Fonseca immigrated to New York and by 1903, Fonseca was operating a factory at 169 Front Street. He became an American citizen in 1895 and by 1905 the registry of cigar factories lists F.E. Fonseca & Co. in a new location: 129 Duane Street (court documents specify 148-150-152 Duane Street, in Tribeca). In New York, at his home at 48 West 73rd St., he and Teresa raised four children - three of whom he named Francisco. Fonseca made frequent trips to Cuba, where he supervised “F.E. Fonseca. Fábrica de Tabacos y Cigarros.” 

Fonseca cigars quickly became a success. Besides having a reputation for selecting the finest quality tobacco, Don Francisco developed an innovative method of packaging his cigars, wrapping each one  separately in a tube of tin foil, and then an outer covering of fine Japanese paper, so as to shield the cigar from atmospheric changes (They are still packaged this way today, with the tubes now usually made of aluminum foil instead of tin). After Don Francisco's premature death of a heart attack, in Havana, in 1929, his wife Teresa continued the business and merged the brand with T. Castañeda and G. Montero to form the firm of Castañeda, Montero, Fonseca SA.

Production continued uninterrupted after the revolution and the cigars are still produced at the Lázaro Pena Factory in Havana. As a cigar brand, Fonseca is relatively mild by most aficionados' standards, sells for cheaper than most other Cuban cigar brands, and is marketed mostly in Spain and Canada, where the brand is particularly popular.

Vitolas in the Fonseca Line

The following list of Vitolas de Salida (commercial Vitolas) within the Fonseca marque lists their size and ring gauge in imperial (and metric), their Vitolas de galera (factory Vitolas), and their common name in American cigar slang. All are hand-made, long-filler cigars with the exception of the Delicias, which use short-filler tobacco.

Hand-Made Vitolas
 Cosaco - 5" × 42 (137 × 16.67 mm), Cosaco, a corona
 Delicia - 4" × 40 (124 × 15.88 mm), Standard, a petit corona
 No. 1 - 6" × 44 (162 × 17.46 mm), Cazador, a lonsdale
 KDT Cadete - 4" × 36 (114 × 14.29 mm), Cadete, a short panetela

Cultural references
Spanish poet Federico García Lorca mentions the “blond head of Fonseca” (la rubia cabeza de Fonseca), along with “the pink of Romeo y Julieta” in his poem “Son de negros en Cuba” (Poet in New York).

See also 
 Cigar brands

References

Further reading
 Nee, Min Ron (2005). An Illustrated Encyclopaedia of Post-Revolution Havana Cigars. Sankt Augustin [Germany]: AWM-Verlag. Reprint; first published 2003. .

External links
 Hyman, Tony. "Cigar History, 1910-1960 ". National Cigar Museum. nationalcigarmuseum.com
 Hyman, Tony. "Cigar History Museum Library Bibliography". cigarhistory.info 
 Official website of Habanos S.A.
 Fonseca Cigars Reviews

Habanos S.A. brands